KCW or kcw may refer to:

 Kinnaird College for Women, a university in Lahore, Pakistan
 KCW, the station code for Kalanchwala railway station, Punjab, Pakistan
 kcw, the ISO 639-3 code for Kabwari language, Democratic Republic of the Congo